This article lists the clandestine networks, also known as circuits, (réseaux in French) established in France by F Section of the British Special Operations Executive during World War II. The SOE agents assigned to each network are also listed. SOE agents, with a few exceptions, were trained in the United Kingdom before being infiltrated into France. Some agents served in more than one network and are listed more than once.

The clandestine networks and agents were "dedicated to encourage and aid resistance" to the German occupation of the country. Activities included gathering intelligence, organizing and supplying indigenous resistance groups, and sabotaging transportation, communications, and industrial facilities. A typical SOE network had three agents: (1) Circuit organiser: leader, planner, and recruiter of new members. 2) Wireless Radio Operator: send and receive wireless messages to and from SOE headquarters in London, encode and decode messages, maintain wireless sets. (3) Courier or messenger: travel between organiser, wireless operator, and resistance groups to deliver and receive messages, and, on occasion, deliver explosives and other equipment. Large networks sometimes had more than one courier and wireless operator.

Each network was given a name and each agent belonging to the network had one or more code names and aliases which he used in France. For example, SOE organiser George Reginald Starr was the organiser of the Wheelwright network and known as "Hilaire" to French contacts in the Resistance and to other SOE personnel.

Nearly 50 SOE networks were operating in France when the country was liberated from German control in 1944. Forty-three circuits were no longer existent at that time of which 31 had been destroyed by the Germans.

Approximately 470 SOE agents served in France during World War II. The Valençay SOE Memorial in Valençay, France lists the names of 91 men and 13 women who were killed, executed, or died in prison while serving as SOE agents.

Networks, operations, and personnel

Asymptote
Operation Asymptote was mounted in February 1944, while the Operational Instructions were quite clear, the disguised objective was to rescue two agents Émile Bollaert and Pierre Brossolette who had been captured on 2 February 1944 while trying to leave Brittany by boat. F. F. E. Yeo-Thomas (alias Shelley, alias Asymptote alias Cheval) and Maurice Lostrie (alias Trieur) were dropped on the night of 24 February 1944 by a RAF Halifax of 161 Squadron on DZ (Drop-zone) Sarrall, 16 km NE of Montluçon, Allier. Yeo-Thomas was captured by the Gestapo on 21 March 1944. Brossolette died while trying to escape the next day.

Autogiro
The first SOE network, organised in Paris by Pierre de Vomécourt in May 1941, but destroyed in May 1942 after being betrayed by Mathilde Carre.
 Georges Bégué – wireless operator; the first SOE agent in France, arriving by parachute the night of 5/6 May 1941. 
 Noel Fernand Rauol Burdeyron (real name, Norman F. Burley) – agent, single-handedly derailed German supply train by pulling up a rail, Autogiro's only successful attack
 Christopher Burney – assigned to assist Burdeyron
 Marcel Clech –  wireless operator
 Raymond Henry Flower
 Pierre de Vomécourt – organiser

Headmaster
 Sonya Butt – courier
 Pierre-Raimond Glaesner – instructor
 Charles Sydney "Soapy" Hudson – organiser
 George Jones – wireless operator
 Brian Rafferty - organiser

Permit
Operated from July to September 1944
 Robert Bruhl – assistant
 Gerard Dedieu – organiser
 Ginette Jullian – courier
 Charles Ronald Shearn.  Arrived in France 8 August 1944. Killed in Burma, 1945.

Physician

Also known as Prosper. Operated in northern France from October 1942 to June 1943. SOE's most important network during that time.  Agents continued to be sent to the Prosper network for some time after it came under control of the Germans in June 1943.
 Francine Agazarian – courier
 Jack Agazarian – wireless operator
 Andrée Borrel – courier
 Jacques Bureau – radio technician
 George William Darling – group leader
 Henri Dericourt, air operations officer
 Noor Inayat Khan, wireless operator. Captured, executed 13 Sep 1944 at Dachau.
 Gilbert Norman – wireless operator
 Yvonne Rudelatt - courier
 Francis Suttill—organiser. Arrived in France on 2 October 1942. Captured, executed.
 Madeleine Tambour
 Germaine Tambour

Silversmith
 Henri Borosh - organiser.
 Madeleine Lavigne – courier and wireless operator

Map of networks as of June 1943
The map below shows the major SOE F Section networks which existed in France in June 1943, based on the map published in Rita Kramer's book "Flames in the Field" (Michael Joseph Ltd, 1995).

Note: The map does not show the correct location of the original Autogiro network, which operated in the Paris area and did not exist after the spring of 1942.  However the network was later revived by Francis Suttill, organiser of Prosper.

See also
 List of SOE Agents
 List of Female SOE Agents
 SOE F Section Codenames & Aliases
 Timeline of SOE's Prosper Network

References

Special Operations Executive